Noyonita Lodh 
(born 8 August 1993) is an Indian model and beauty pageant winner who was crowned Miss Diva Universe 2014 and represented India at Miss Universe 2014 in Doral, Florida, United States on 25 January 2015 where she placed in the Top 15.

Early life
Noyonita was born in Bangalore, India. She did her schooling from The Frank Anthony Public School, Bangalore, the same school from which India's second Miss Universe Lara Dutta got qualified. For her higher studies she got enrolled in St. Joseph's College of Commerce, Bangalore.

Pageantry

MAX Miss Bangalore 2011
She was crowned 2nd Runner-up at MAX Miss Bangalore 2011 contest and also won Miss Catwalk sub-award there.

Miss Diva - 2014
Noyonita was crowned Miss Diva Universe 2014 by the outgoing titleholder Manasi Moghe, the first ever winner of Miss Diva pageant. Noyonita also won Miss Catwalk sub-award at the event.

Miss Universe 2014
She represented India at Miss Universe 2014 held at Doral, Florida, USA on 25 January 2015, she was placed in the Top 15. She was also among the top 5 finalist in the Best National Costume round at the said pageant. Her national costume design was by Melvyn Noronha.

References

Femina Miss India
Miss Universe 2014 contestants
Indian beauty pageant winners
1993 births
Female models from Bangalore
Living people